Petr Netušil is Czech sprint canoer who competed from the late 1990s to the mid-2000s. He won six medals at the ICF Canoe Sprint World Championships with five silvers (C-2 200 m: 2002, 2003; C-4 200 m: 2001, 2003, 2005) and one bronze C-4 1000 m: 1998).

References

Czech male canoeists
Living people
Year of birth missing (living people)
ICF Canoe Sprint World Championships medalists in Canadian